Joseph Brome may refer to:

Joseph Brome (British Army officer, died 1796) (1713–1796), Master Gunner, St James's Park, the most senior Ceremonial Post in the Royal Artillery after the Sovereign
Joseph Brome (British Army officer, died 1825), British Royal Artillery officer who served during the Napoleonic Wars